In special relativity, four-momentum (also called momentum–energy or momenergy ) is the generalization of the classical three-dimensional momentum to four-dimensional spacetime. Momentum is a vector in three dimensions; similarly four-momentum is a four-vector in spacetime.  The contravariant four-momentum of a particle with relativistic energy  and three-momentum , where  is the particle's three-velocity and  the Lorentz factor, is

The quantity  of above is ordinary non-relativistic momentum of the particle and  its rest mass. The four-momentum is useful in relativistic calculations because it is a Lorentz covariant vector.  This means that it is easy to keep track of how it transforms under Lorentz transformations.

The above definition applies under the coordinate convention that . It is also possible to define covariant four-momentum  where the sign of the energy (or the sign of the three-momentum, depending on the chosen metric signature) is reversed.

Minkowski norm 

Calculating the Minkowski norm squared of the four-momentum gives a Lorentz invariant quantity equal (up to factors of the speed of light ) to the square of the particle's proper mass:

where

is the metric tensor of special relativity with metric signature for definiteness chosen to be . The negativity of the norm reflects that the momentum is a timelike four-vector for massive particles. The other choice of signature would flip signs in certain formulas (like for the norm here). This choice is not important, but once made it must for consistency be kept throughout.

The Minkowski norm is Lorentz invariant, meaning its value is not changed by Lorentz transformations/boosting into different frames of reference.

Relation to four-velocity 

For a massive particle, the four-momentum is given by the particle's invariant mass  multiplied by the particle's four-velocity,

where the four-velocity  is

and

is the Lorentz factor (associated with the speed ),  is the speed of light.

Derivation 
There are several ways to arrive at the correct expression for four-momentum. One way is to first define the four-velocity  and simply define , being content that it is a four-vector with the correct units and correct behavior. Another, more satisfactory, approach is to begin with the principle of least action and use the Lagrangian framework to derive the four-momentum, including the expression for the energy. One may at once, using the observations detailed below, define four-momentum from the action . Given that in general for a closed system with generalized coordinates  and canonical momenta ,

is a covariant four-vector with the three-vector part being the (negative of) canonical momentum.

Consider initially a system of one degree of freedom . In the derivation of the equations of motion from the action using Hamilton's principle, one finds (generally) in an intermediate stage for the variation of the action,

The assumption is then that the varied paths satisfy , from which Lagrange's equations follow at once. When the equations of motion are known (or simply assumed to be satisfied), one may let go of the requirement . In this case the path is assumed to satisfy the equations of motion, and the action is a function of the upper integration limit , but  is still fixed.

Observing that

one concludes

In a similar fashion, keep endpoints fixed, but let  vary. This time, the system is allowed to move through configuration space at "arbitrary speed" or with "more or less energy", the field equations still assumed to hold and variation can be carried out on the integral, but instead observe

by the fundamental theorem of calculus. Compute using the above expression for canonical momenta,

Now using

where  is the Hamiltonian, leads to, since  in the present case,

In this context,  is called Hamilton's principal function.

The action  is given by

where  is the relativistic Lagrangian for a free particle. From this,

The variation of the action is

To calculate , observe first that  and that

So

or

and thus

which is just

Now compare the last three expressions to find

with norm , and the famed result for the relativistic energy,

where  is the now unfashionable relativistic mass, follows. By comparing the expressions for momentum and energy directly, one has

that holds for massless particles as well. Squaring the expressions for energy and three-momentum and relating them gives the energy–momentum relation,

Substituting

in the equation for the norm gives the relativistic Hamilton–Jacobi equation,

It is also possible to derive the results from the Lagrangian directly. By definition,

which constitute the standard formulae for canonical momentum and energy of a closed (time-independent Lagrangian) system. With this approach it is less clear that the energy and momentum are parts of a four-vector.

The energy and the three-momentum are separately conserved quantities for isolated systems in the Lagrangian framework. Hence four-momentum is conserved as well. More on this below.

More pedestrian approaches include expected behavior in electrodynamics. In this approach, the starting point is application of Lorentz force law and Newton's second law in the rest frame of the particle. The transformation properties of the electromagnetic field tensor, including invariance of electric charge, are then used to transform to the lab frame, and the resulting expression (again Lorentz force law) is interpreted in the spirit of Newton's second law, leading to the correct expression for the relativistic three- momentum. The disadvantage, of  course, is that it isn't immediately clear that the result applies to all particles, whether charged or not, and that it doesn't yield the complete four-vector.

It is also possible to avoid electromagnetism and use well tuned experiments of thought involving well-trained physicists throwing billiard balls, utilizing knowledge of the velocity addition formula and assuming conservation of momentum. This too gives only the three-vector part.

Conservation of four-momentum 
As shown above, there are three conservation laws (not independent, the last two imply the first and vice versa):
 The four-momentum  (either covariant or contravariant) is conserved.
 The total energy  is conserved.
 The 3-space momentum  is conserved (not to be confused with the classic non-relativistic momentum ).

Note that the invariant mass of a system of particles may be more than the sum of the particles' rest masses, since kinetic energy in the system center-of-mass frame and potential energy from forces between the particles contribute to the invariant mass. As an example, two particles with four-momenta  and  each have (rest) mass 3GeV/c2 separately, but their total mass (the system mass) is 10GeV/c2. If these particles were to collide and stick, the mass of the composite object would be 10GeV/c2.

This technique is used, e.g., in experimental searches for Z′ bosons at high-energy particle colliders, where the Z′ boson would show up as a bump in the invariant mass spectrum of electron–positron or muon–antimuon pairs.

If the mass of an object does not change, the Minkowski inner product of its four-momentum and corresponding four-acceleration  is simply zero. The four-acceleration is proportional to the proper time derivative of the four-momentum divided by the particle's mass, so

Canonical momentum in the presence of an electromagnetic potential 
For a charged particle of charge , moving in an electromagnetic field given by the electromagnetic four-potential:

where  is the scalar potential and  the vector potential, the components of the (not gauge-invariant) canonical momentum four-vector  is

This, in turn, allows the potential energy from the charged particle in an electrostatic potential and the Lorentz force on the charged particle moving in a magnetic field to be incorporated in a compact way, in relativistic quantum mechanics.

See also 

 Four-force
 Four-gradient
 Pauli–Lubanski pseudovector

References

 

 Wikisource version

Four-vectors
Momentum